Sidol is a small settlement in the Tuhinj Valley in the Municipality of Kamnik in the Upper Carniola region of Slovenia. It lies in a small enclosed valley in the hills above Šmartno v Tuhinju.

Geography

Sidol is a clustered village on a small plain above the Nevljica River. To the south are Bare Peak (Goli vrh) and Velink Hill. Sidol includes the hamlet of Jevnik in a small valley west of the main village core.

Name
Sidol was first mentioned in written sources in 1291 and circa 1400 as Suchidol (and as Suchwdol in 1477, as Sihidal in 1664, and as s Sidala in 1769). The name is a dialect contraction of Suhi dol (literally, 'dry valley'; Suhí dôl > Shídol > Sídol). The name refers to the local geography because there is no spring in Sidol.

History
A bronze sculpture of a Roman deity was unearthed in Sidol in 1899 during excavation for a cistern, attesting to early settlement in the area.

Mass grave

Sidol is the site of a mass grave from the period immediately after the Second World War. It contains the remains of Croatian soldiers, civilians, and Slovenes that were imprisoned at Šmartno v Tuhinju and murdered on May 13, 1945.

References

External links

Sidol on Geopedia

Populated places in the Municipality of Kamnik